No. 659 Squadron was a Royal Air Force Air Observation Post squadron associated with the 21st Army Group during World War II. Numbers 651 to 663 Squadrons of the RAF were Air Observation Post units working closely with Army units in artillery spotting and liaison. Their duties and squadron numbers were transferred to the Army with the formation of the Army Air Corps on 1 September 1957.

History
No. 659 Squadron was formed at RAF Firbeck on 30 April 1943 with the Auster III and from March 1944 the Auster IV. The squadron role was to support the Army and in June 1944 it moved to France. Fighting in the break-out from Normandy it followed the army across the low countries and into Germany. In October 1945 the squadron left for India, where it was eventually disbanded at Lahore on 14 August 1947.

The squadron today is represented by 659 Squadron of 9 Regiment, Army Air Corps.

Aircraft operated

See also
 List of Royal Air Force aircraft squadrons
 Army Air Corps

References

Notes

Bibliography

External links
 Squadron history for nos. 651–670 sqn. at RAF Web
 659 sqn. page of RAF website

659 Squadron
Aircraft squadrons of the Royal Air Force in World War II
Military units and formations established in 1943